The Firjan (also al-Firjan) is an Arab Murabtin tribe in Libya. They live in north-eastern Libya, with large populations in the Sirte, Ajdabiya and Benghazi districts. The nisbah of tribe is al-Firjani.

Libyan civil war
While many Firjani joined the revolt against Muammar Gaddafi (most notably in Ajdabiya and Benghazi) the status of others such as those in Sirte is uncertain. Khalifa Haftar, the current commander of the Libyan National Army is Firjani. His brother is the chief of the Firjan community in Benghazi.

References

 (1995), Tree of Ashraf Tribes in Libya, Nasab Newspaper (Morocco), p.6

Arabs in Libya
Tribes of Libya
First Libyan Civil War